The sack of 455 was the third of four ancient sacks of Rome; it was conducted by the Vandals, who were then at war with the usurping Western Roman Emperor Petronius Maximus.

Background
In the 440s, the Vandal king Genseric and the Roman Emperor Valentinian III had betrothed their children, Huneric and Eudocia, to strengthen their alliance, reached in 442 with a peace treaty (the marriage was delayed as Eudocia was too young). In 455 Valentinian was killed, and Petronius Maximus rose to the throne. Petronius married Valentinian's widow, Licinia Eudoxia, and had his son Palladius marry Eudocia; in this way Petronius was to strengthen his bond with the Theodosian dynasty. Unhappy, however, with her husband's murder and the usurpation of Maximus, Eudoxia turned to aid from the Vandals to remove Maximus from the throne. The overture was favorably met, because Maximus' revolution was damaging to Genseric's ambitions. The king of the Vandals claimed that the broken betrothal between Huneric and Eudocia invalidated his peace treaty with Valentinian, and set sail to attack Rome, landing at Ostia at the mouth of the Tiber.

The sack
Before approaching the city, the Vandals knocked down all of the city's aqueducts. At the sight of the approaching Vandals, Maximus and his soldiers tried to flee the city, but he was spotted and killed by a Roman mob outside the city, possibly together with his son Palladius. Upon the Vandal arrival, according to the chronicler Prosper of Aquitaine, Pope Leo I requested that Genseric not destroy the ancient city nor murder its inhabitants. Genseric agreed and the gates of Rome were thrown open to him and his men.

While Genseric kept his promise not to burn the city and slaughter its inhabitants, he did carry some off to be slaves, and during that time Genseric managed to capture Empress Licinia Eudoxia, Valentinian's widow, and her daughters, Eudocia and Placidia as they tried to escape. Eudoxia and her children were the last of Rome's imperial family. Eudocia would later marry Huneric.

Aftermath

It is accepted that Genseric looted great amounts of treasure from the city, damaging objects of cultural significance such as the Temple of Jupiter Optimus Maximus by stripping away the gilt bronze roof tiles, hence the modern term vandalism. The sack of 455 is generally seen as being more destructive than the Visigothic sack of 410, because the Vandals plundered Rome for fourteen days whereas the Visigoths spent only three days in the city.

Assessment of the sack
Despite the popular image of Vandals as destructors, the severity of the sack is debatable. A cause of significant controversy is the claim that the sack was relatively "clean", in that there was little murder and violence, and the Vandals did not burn the buildings of the city. This interpretation seems to stem from Prosper's claim that Pope Leo I managed to persuade Genseric to refrain from violence. However, Victor of Vita records that a number of shiploads of captives arrived in Africa from Rome, with the purpose of being sold into slavery. Similarly, the Byzantine historian Procopius reports that a church was burned down. Some modern historians like John Henry Haaren stated that temples, public buildings, private houses and even the emperor's palace were sacked. Besides taking many Romans as slaves, the Vandals also committed other depredations like taking immense quantities of gold, silver, jewels and furniture, destroying works of art, and killing a number of citizens.

References

Citations

Sources
 Procopius, 'The Vandalic War' in The History of the Wars, Books III & IV, trans. H.B Dewing (Cambridge; Mass. 1916)
 Muhlberger, S., The Fifth Century Chroniclers: Prosper, Hydatius and the Gallic Chronicler of 452 (Leeds, 1990) — for Prosper's hagiographic portrayal of Leo.
 Victor of Vita, History of the Vandal Persecution, trans. J. Moorhead (Liverpool, 1992).
 Ward-Perkins, B., The Fall of Rome and the End of Civilisation (Oxford, 2005) pp. 17 & 189.

455
450s conflicts
Ancient city of Rome
Rome 455
Rome 455
Rome 455
5th century in Italy
450s in the Roman Empire
Military history of Rome
Vandal Kingdom
Western Roman Empire
Looting